Phallomedusa austrina is a species of small, air-breathing land snail with an operculum, a pulmonate gastropod mollusc in the family Phallomedusidae.

Distribution 
Australia.

References

Phallomedusidae
Gastropods described in 2007